Todd Fischer may refer to:
 Todd Fischer (baseball)
 Todd Fischer (golfer)